{{DISPLAYTITLE:NAD+ kinase}}

NAD+ kinase (EC 2.7.1.23, NADK) is an enzyme that converts nicotinamide adenine dinucleotide (NAD+) into NADP+ through phosphorylating the NAD+ coenzyme. NADP+ is an essential coenzyme that is reduced to NADPH primarily by the pentose phosphate pathway to provide reducing power in biosynthetic processes such as fatty acid biosynthesis and nucleotide synthesis. The structure of the NADK from the archaean Archaeoglobus fulgidus has been determined.

In humans, the genes NADK and MNADK encode NAD+ kinases localized in cytosol and mitochondria, respectively. Similarly, yeast have both cytosolic and mitochondrial isoforms, and the yeast mitochondrial isoform accepts both NAD+ and NADH as substrates for phosphorylation.

Reaction 

ATP + NAD+  ADP + NADP+

Mechanism 

NADK phosphorylates NAD+ at the 2’ position of the ribose ring that carries the adenine moiety. It is highly selective for its substrates, NAD and ATP, and does not tolerate modifications either to the phosphoryl acceptor, NAD, or the pyridine moiety of the phosphoryl donor, ATP. NADK also uses metal ions to coordinate the ATP in the active site. In vitro studies with various divalent metal ions have shown that zinc and manganese are preferred over magnesium, while copper and nickel are not accepted by the enzyme at all. A proposed mechanism involves the 2' alcohol oxygen acting as a nucleophile to attack the gamma-phosphoryl of ATP, releasing ADP.

Regulation 

NADK is highly regulated by the redox state of the cell. Whereas NAD is predominantly found in its oxidized state NAD+, the phosphorylated NADP is largely present in its reduced form, as NADPH. Thus, NADK can modulate responses to oxidative stress by controlling NADP synthesis. Bacterial NADK is shown to be inhibited allosterically by both NADPH and NADH. NADK is also reportedly stimulated by calcium/calmodulin binding in certain cell types, such as neutrophils. NAD kinases in plants and sea urchin eggs have also been found to bind calmodulin.

Clinical significance 

Due to the essential role of NADPH in lipid and DNA biosynthesis and the hyperproliferative nature of most cancers, NADK is an attractive target for cancer therapy. Furthermore, NADPH is required for the antioxidant activities of thioredoxin reductase and glutaredoxin. Thionicotinamide and other nicotinamide analogs are potential inhibitors of NADK, and studies show that treatment of colon cancer cells with thionicotinamide suppresses the cytosolic NADPH pool to increase oxidative stress and synergizes with chemotherapy.

While the role of NADK in increasing the NADPH pool appears to offer protection against apoptosis, there are also cases where NADK activity appears to potentiate cell death. Genetic studies done in human haploid cell lines indicate that knocking out NADK may protect from certain non-apoptotic stimuli.

See also 
Oxidative phosphorylation
Electron transport chain
Metabolism

References

Further reading

External links 
ENZYME entry on EC 2.7.1.23
BRENDA entry on EC 2.7.1.23
 PDBe-KB provides an overview of all the structure information available in the PDB for Human NAD kinase

EC 2.7.1
Cellular respiration
Metabolism